The 1522 Almería earthquake was a major seismic event estimated to be 6.8–7.0  that occurred on September 22. The epicenter was in the capital of Almeria in the Andarax Valley, near Alhama de Almería. It had a maximum felt intensity of X–XI (Extreme), and killed about 2,500 people, making it the most destructive earthquake in Spanish history.

The city of Almería was destroyed, and there was serious destruction in 80 other towns. In Granada large cracks was observed in various walls and towers. Some damage also occurred at the Alhambra, more than 100 kilometers away from the epicenter.

See also
 List of earthquakes in Spain
 Carboneras Fault
 1804 Almería earthquake

References

Earthquakes in Spain
Almería
History of Almería
1522 in Spain